SceneAround is a theatrical performance system. It involves a rotating auditorium with the sets built around the auditorium. The auditorium is a so-called revolve on which the audience rotates from scene to scene.

Origin

The system was developed and used for the Dutch musical production Soldier of Orange, produced by Robin de Levita and Fred Boot.
 
De Levita invented SceneAround as a solution to play a large scale production inside a former airplane hangar at former military airport Valkenburg between Wassenaar, Katwijk and Leiden. The auditorium is surrounded by projection panels that can open up in various width up to 180 degrees and frame each set.

Auditorium
The auditorium was designed by Dutchman Robert Nieuwenhuis. Within three months, a gigantic steel turntable with 1100 seats was created. The turning movement, speed and direction can be adjusted by computer. The auditorium is able to spin on its axis in both ways seven times.

Facts
 Diameter turntable: 33 m
 Speed: 1,2 metre per second
 Weight: 300 ton, the audience included
 Seats: 1103

Set
Austrian Bernhard Hammer designed the set for the musical production, directed by Theu Boermans. The set is built around the auditorium, revealed by the moving panels. While the audience rotates to a new scene, the scene transformations are achieved by the motion of the auditorium, the movement of the projection panels and any live action in front of the screens. By using theatrical masking techniques, the reference to the actual location is avoided.

Technique
The control of the turntable revolving auditorium and the screens are automated and linked to the sound and projection cues.

Company
Designers, engineers and companies that contributed to the initial production started the company SceneAround. The company wants to create similar theatrical venues around the world.

TheaterAmsterdam
A new theater "TheaterAmsterdam", located on the south-west side of the port of Amsterdam, will be the first permanent theater in the world to be a full, large-scale SceneAround rotating auditorium. A new play based on the Anne Frank diaries will premiere May 8, 2014, play indefinitely, and is the first play based on Anne Frank that will feature  quotes from her diaries, in her own words as it were, in the scenes performed. The building of the theater and production of the play ANNE has been made possible by the huge (financial) success of the Soldier of Orange play at TheaterHangaar.

The theater, build from scratch in just 7 months, will be larger than TheaterHangaar and feature VIP-lounges and a large restaurant. The theater and musical are both realized, in part, by the same team of people and group of companies (previously) involved with TheaterHangaar and the Soldier of Orange play, though the cast will be distinct from that musical.

References

External links
 http://www.prosoundnewseurope.com/main-content/full/soldier-of-orange-is-a-wheel-musical-treat
 http://www.thetimes.co.uk/tto/arts/stage/theatre/article3645328.ece
 http://www.blitzlive.co.uk/pdf/Blitz-SoldierOfOrange.pdf
 http://www.musical.nl/musical/anne
 http://www.theateramsterdam.nl

Stagecraft